Kukepala is a village in Kose Parish, Harju County in northern Estonia.

References

Villages in Harju County